André Siegfried (April 21, 1875 – March 28, 1959) was a French academic, geographer and political writer best known to English speakers for his commentaries on American, Canadian, and British politics.

He was born in Le Havre, France, to Jules Siegfried, the French minister of commerce, and Julie Siegfried, the president of the National Council of French Women.  A few months after the liberation of France in mid-1944, he was elected to the Académie française, taking the vacant seat of Gabriel Hanotaux (who had been elected in 1897). He died in Paris in March 1959.

Works 

 Afrique du Sud ; notes de voyage, Paris, A. Colin, 1949
 Albert Schweitzer études et témoignages, Éd. Robert Amadou, Bruxelles, Éditions de la Main jetée, 1951
 Amérique latine, Paris, A. Colin, 1934. 
 Aspects de la société française, Paris, Pichon, 1954
 Aspects du XXe, Paris, Hachette 1955. 
 Cinq propos sur la langue française, with Mario Roques, Paris, Fondation Singer-Polignac, 1955
 Cotonniers aux Indes, Paris, 1950
 Croisade. Conférences contradictoires, with Alfred Wautier d'Aygalliers, Charles Riandey, Union de libres-penseurs et de libres croyants pour la culture morale, Paris, Fischbacher, 1931
 De la IIIe à la IVe République, Paris, B. Grasset 1956
 De la IVe à la Ve République au jour le jour, Paris, B. Grasset, 1958
 Deux Mois en Amérique du Nord à la veille de la guerre (juin-juillet 1914), Paris, A. Colin, 1916. 
 Discours de réception à l'Académie française. 16 janvier 1947, Éd. Maurice Garçon, Paris, A. Fayard, 1947
 Discours prononcés dans la séance publique tenue par L'Académie française pour la réception de M. Daniel-Rops, le jeudi 22 mars 1956, Paris, Typographie de Firmin-Didot, 1956
 Édouard Le Roy et son fauteuil, with Henri Daniel-Rops, Paris, A. Fayard 1956
 Edward Gibbon Wakefield et sa doctrine de la colonisation systématique, Paris, Armand Colin, 1904
 En Amérique du Sud : Articles parus dans le Petit Havre de juillet à décembre 1931, Le Havre, Le Petit Havre, 1932
 [https://archive.org/details/in.ernet.dli.2015.216200England's Crisis] (London:  Cape, 1931)
 Enquête politique, économique & sociale sur la Nouvelle-Zélande, Paris, Bureaux de la Revue politique et parlementaire, 1900
 États-Unis, Canada, Mexique : lettres de voyage écrites au Petit Havre, Le Havre, Le Journal, 1936
 Fourrure et pelletiers à travers les âges, with Jean H. Prat, Paris, Éd. du Tigre 1960
 France, Angleterre, États-Unis, Canada, Paris, Emile-Paul 1946
 Géographie économique. Cours de Université de Paris, Institut d'études politiques, année 1953-1954, Paris, Centre de documentation universitaire, 1954
 Géographie électorale de l'Ardèche sous la 3e République, Paris, Colin, 1949
 Géographie humoristique de Paris, Paris, La Passerelle, 1951
 Géographie poétique des cinq continents, Paris, La Passerelle, 1952
 Histoire politique de la IIIe République. Tome premier, L'avant guerre (1906-1914), with Georges Bonnefous, Paris, Presses universitaires de France, 1956, 1994
 Impressions de voyage en Amérique : 1914, Le Havre, Randolet, 1915
 Impressions du Brésil. Articles parus dans le Petit Havre du 5 au 19 septembre 1937, Le Havre, Impr. du journal le Petit Havre, 1937
 Itinéraires de contagions. Épidémies et idéologies, Paris, Armand Colin, 1960. 
 La Civilisation occidentale, Oxford, Clarendon Press, 1945
 La Crise britannique au XXe siècle, Paris, A. Colin, 1931
 La Crise de l'Europe, Paris, Calmann-Lévy, 1935; pub. in trans. as [https://archive.org/details/dli.ministry.12387 Europe's Crisis] (London: Jonathan Cape, 1935)
 La Démocratie en Nouvelle-Zélande, Paris, A. Colin, 1904
 La Dignité humaine, with Russel W. Davenport, Paris, Nouvelles éditions latines, 1958
 La Fontaine, Machiavel français, Paris, Ventadour, 1955
 La Langue française et les conditions de la vie moderne, with Josef Felixberger, Munich, Hueber 1968
 La Mer et l'empire. Série de vingt-deux conférences faites à l'Institut maritime et colonial, Paris, J. Renard 1944
 La Suisse, démocratie-témoin, with Pierre Béguin, Neuchâtel, La Baconnière, 1969
 La Technique et la culture dans une civilisation moderne, Paris, F.N. Syndicats d'ingénieurs et des cadres supérieurs, 1953
 La Zone sterling, with Jean de Sailly, Paris, A. Colin, 1957
 L'Alsace. Photographies originales, with Michel Nicolas, Paris, del Duca 1953
 L'Âme des peuples, Paris, Hachette 1950. 
 L'Amérique ibérique, with Jacques de Lauwe, Paris, Gallimard, 1937
 L'Angleterre d'aujourd'hui : son évolution économique et politique, Paris, Grès, 1924.
 L'Angleterre moderne. Le problème social, l'expérience travailliste, with André Philip, Paris, Ed. G. Crès et Cie, 1925
 L'Année politique, 1946 : revue chronologiques des principaux faits politiques économiques et sociaux de la France du 1er janvier 1946 au 1er janvier 1947, Paris : Éditions du Grand Siècle, 1947
 L'Artisanat rural, ses problèmes actuels, with Lucien Gelly, Paris, Institut d'études corporatives et sociales, 1944
 [https://archive.org/details/lecanadalesdeux00sieggoogLe Canada, les deux races ; problèmes politiques contemporains], Paris, A. Colin, 1906; pub. in trans. as [https://archive.org/details/racequestioninca00siegThe Race Question in Canada] (London: Eveleigh Nash, 1907) 
 Le Canada, puissance internationale, Paris, A. Colin, 1937
 Le Capital américain et la conscience du roi. Le Néo-capitalisme aux États-Unis, with A. A. Berle, and Hélène Flamant, Paris, A. Colin, 1957
 Le Centenaire des services des Messageries Maritimes, (1851-1951), Éd. Jérôme et Jean Tharaud, Paris, Ettighoffer et Raynaud, 1952
 Le Développement économique de l'Amérique latine, Paris, SPID, 1947
 Le Grand changement de l'Amérique (1900-1950), with Frederick Lewis Allen and Roger Blondel, Paris, Amiot-Dumont, 1953
 Le Rôle moral et social d'Israël dans les démocraties contemporaines, Paris, Cahiers d'études juives, 1932
 Le XXe, âge de vitesse, Roma, Centro per lo sviluppo dei trasporti aerei, 1954
 L'Économie dirigée, with Chassain de Marcilly et al. Paris, F. Alcan, 1934
 Les États-Unis d'aujourd'hui : avec 8 cartes et figures, Paris, Librairie Armand Colin, 1927
 Les États-Unis et la civilisation américaine, Paris, Centre de documentation universitaire, 1947
 Les États-Unis tels que je les ai vus il y a cinquante ans et cette année, Conférence prononcée à l'Assemblée générale du G.I.R.E.P. le 25 avril 1956, Paris, 1957
 Les Forces religieuses et la vie politique. Le catholicisme et le protestantisme, with André Latreille, Paris, A. Colin, 1951
 Les Grandes Œuvres politiques de Machiavel à nos jours, with Jean-Jacques Chevallier, Paris, A. Colin, 1960
 Les Principaux Courants de la pensée religieuse en France : conférence prononcée à l'Hôtel Majestic, à Buenos-Aires le 17 septembre 1931, Éd. Buénos-Ayres : Comité Pro-Église Évangélique de Langue Française, 1931
 Les Problèmes ethniques de l'Afrique du Sud : conférence faite à la tribune de l'Université Coloniale de Belgique à Anvers le 21 février 1949, Anvers, Association des Anciens Étudiants de l'Université Coloniale de Belgique, 1949
 Les Questions actuelles de politique étrangère dans l'Amérique du Nord, Paris, F. Alcan, 1911. 
 Les Voies d'Israël. Essai d'interprétation de la religion juive, Paris, Hachette 1958
 L'Esprit de l'histoire d'Angleterre, with A. L. Rowse, Paris, R. Julliard 1951
 L'Occident et la direction spirituelle du monde. (Allocution prononcée le vendredi 18 novembre 1932.), Neuilly, La Cause, 1932
 L'Œuvre scientifique d'André Siegfried, Paris, Presses de la Fondation nationale des sciences politiques, 1977
 Mes Souvenirs de la IIIe république. Mon père et son temps, Jules Siegfried, 1836-1922, Paris, Presses universitaires de France, 1946
 Mes Souvenirs d'enfance, Bourges, Tardy, 1957
 Mon Village sous la IVe République, Éd. Henri Baudet, Corrie Siohan-Psichari, Groningen, 1965
 Normandie, with Noël Le Boyer, Paris, Hachette 1957
 Nous sommes restés des Hommes, with Sidney Stewart, Québec, Le Club des livres à succès, 1950, 1961
 Pourquoi la Mission ? Éd. Marc André Boegner, Paris, Société des Missions Évangéliques, 1950
 Progrès technique et progrès moral, Éd. Nicolas Berdiaeff, Neuchâtel, La Baconnière, 1948
 Quelques Maximes, Paris, J. Haumont, 1946
 Quelques Règles à observer dans le travail, [S.l.s.n.], 1900-1977? 11
 Qu'est-ce que l'Amérique ?, Paris, Flammarion 1938. 
 Savoir parler en public, Paris, Michel 1950. 
 Suez, Panama et les routes maritimes mondiales, Paris, A. Colin, 1940
 Tableau des États-Unis, Paris, A. Colin, 1954. 
 Tableau des partis en France, Paris, B. Grasset 1930
 Tableau politique de la France de l'Ouest sous la Troisième République. 102 cartes et croquis, 1 carte hors texte, Paris, A. Colin, 1913 ; réimp. Genève/Paris/Gex, Slatkine Reprints, 1980; réimp. Paris, Impr. nationale éditions, 1995; reimp, Bruxelles, Éditions de l'Université de Bruxelles, 2010.
 Vers un Ordre économique et social, Eugène Mathon 1860-1935 : sa vie, ses idées, ses œuvres, with Henry-Louis Dubly, Paris, [s.n.], 1946
 Vocation de Pont-à-Mousson, Nancy, 1957
 Voyage aux Indes, Paris, Colin, 1951. 
 Vue générale de la Méditerranée, Paris, Gallimard 1943

Further reading
 Kennedy, Sean. "Situating France: The Career of André Siegfried, 1900-40." Historical Reflections/Réflexions Historiques (2004): 179–203.
 Kennedy, Sean. "André Siegfried and the Complexities of French Anti-Americanism." French Politics, Culture & Society 27.2 (2009): 1-22.
 Roger, Philippe. The American enemy: the history of French anti-Americanism (U of Chicago Press, 2005), passim.
 Sanguin, André-Louis. "Political geographers of the past II André Siegfried, an unconventional French political geographer." Political Geography Quarterly 4.1 (1985): 79–83.

External links 
 Siegfried bio on academie-francaise.fr
 "André Siegfried" The Canadian Encyclopedia.

1875 births
1959 deaths
Writers from Le Havre
Burials at Passy Cemetery
Members of the Académie des sciences morales et politiques
20th-century French historians
20th-century French writers
Grand Officiers of the Légion d'honneur
Members of the Académie Française
Sciences Po alumni
Lycée Condorcet alumni
20th-century French male writers
French male non-fiction writers